The women's road race competition of the cycling events at the 2011 Pan American Games was held on October 22 at the Guadalajara Circuit in Guadalajara. The defending Pan American Games champion was Yumari González of Cuba, who finished second and earned a silver medal.

Schedule
All times are Central Standard Time (UTC−6).

Results
33 competitors from 16 countries are scheduled to compete.

References

External links
 Road cycling schedule

Cycling at the 2011 Pan American Games
2011 in women's road cycling
Road cycling at the Pan American Games